Modesto Faustini (27 May 1839 – 1891) was an Italian painter.

Faustini was born in Brescia and died in Rome. He was initially trained as a carpenter in the orphanage of Brescia, but then was trained in the Brera Academy under a scholarship of Tosio Martinengo. In 1869, he won a stipend at the Brescian competition and moved to Rome. Faustini tended to paint religious canvases. His most prominent works were St Francis of Assisi, The Loves of the Angels, Janghen var, and a painting of Saints Cecilia, Catherie, and Lucia. In Milan he painted two medallions under the portico of Brera. He also painted in the Pacheco Chapel of Buenos Aires and the Spanish Chapel in the Basilica of the Holy House at Loreto.

Gallery

References

External links

1839 births
1891 deaths
People from Codogno
19th-century Italian painters
19th-century Italian male artists
Italian male painters
Painters from Milan